Ai of Han may refer to:

Marquess Ai of Han (died 374 BC)
Emperor Ai of Han (27–1 BC)